Clorida is a genus of shrimps belonging to the family Squillidae.

The species of this genus are found in Northern America, Southeastern Asia, Southern Africa and Australia.

Species:
 Clorida albolitura Ahyong & Naiyanetr, 2000
 Clorida bombayensis (Chhapgar & Sane, 1967)
 Clorida daviei Ahyong, 2001
 Clorida decorata Wood-Mason, 1875
 Clorida denticauda (Chhapgar & Sane, 1967)
 Clorida depressa (Miers, 1880)
 Clorida gaillardi Moosa, 1986
 Clorida granti (Stephenson, 1953)
 Clorida japonica Manning, 1978
 Clorida javanica Moosa, 1974
 Clorida latreillei Eydoux & Souleyet, 1842
 Clorida obtusa Ahyong, 2001
 Clorida rotundicauda (Miers, 1880)
 Clorida seversi Moosa, 1973
 Clorida wassenbergi Ahyong, 2001

References

Stomatopoda